Shambiran (also Romanized as Shambīrān) is a village in Kangan Rural District, in the Central District of Jask County, Hormozgan Province, Iran. At the 2006 census, its population was 117, in 18 families.

References 

Populated places in Jask County